Darrough Chapel is an unincorporated community in Center Township, Howard County, Indiana, United States. Named after Darrough Chapel Church, it has been in existence since at least 1894. It is part of the Kokomo, Indiana, Metropolitan Statistical Area.
 
Darrough Chapel lies outside the city limits of Kokomo, and according to a March 11, 2011, report in the Kokomo Perspective, "At present, Darrough Chapel is excluded from all annexation proposals that have been made by the city."

Geography

References

Unincorporated communities in Howard County, Indiana
Unincorporated communities in Indiana
Kokomo, Indiana metropolitan area